Medina is a village in Tolna County, central Hungary. Majority of residents in the village are ethnic Hungarians, with traditional minorities of Serbs and Romani people. Historical manor house that once belonged to the Apponyi family is now operated as a boutique hotel.

Twin municipalities or villages 
  Borovo

References

External links 
 Street map 

Populated places in Tolna County